Žitkovci is a village in the Municipality of Dobrovnik in the Prekmurje region of Slovenia.

The small church in the settlement is dedicated to Saint Florian and belongs to the Parish of Dobrovnik.

References

External links
Žitkovci on Geopedia

Populated places in the Municipality of Dobrovnik